Make Me a Star is a 1932 American pre-Code romantic comedy film directed by William Beaudine and starring Joan Blondell, Stuart Erwin and ZaSu Pitts. The film is a remake of the 1924 silent film Merton of the Movies, based upon the 1922 novel of that name, and the 1923 play adapted from the novel by George S. Kaufman, and Marc Connelly. It was remade again in 1947.

Plot
A small-town delivery boy Merton Gill (Stuart Erwin) arrives in Hollywood, bright-eyed and bushy-tailed and complete with a diploma from the National Correspondence Academy of Acting. Crashing the gates of Majestic Pictures Merton manages to fumble his one line bit in the latest Buck Benson (George Templeton) western and is fired on the spot.

Cast
 Joan Blondell as 'Flips' Montague 
 Stuart Erwin as Merton Gill 
 ZaSu Pitts as Mrs. Scudder
 Ben Turpin as Ben 
 Charles Sellon as Mr. Gashwiler 
 Florence Roberts as Mrs. Gashwiler 
 Helen Jerome Eddy as Tessie Kearns 
 Arthur Hoyt as Hardy Powell 
 George Templeton as Buck Benson
 Ruth Donnelly as The Countess 
 Sam Hardy as Jeff Baird 
 Oscar Apfel as Henshaw

Cameo appearances (as themselves)
 Tallulah Bankhead
 Clive Brook
 Maurice Chevalier
 Claudette Colbert
 Gary Cooper
 Phillips Holmes
 Fredric March
 Jack Oakie
 Charles Ruggles
 Sylvia Sidney

References
Notes

Bibliography
 Marshall, Wendy L. (2005) William Beaudine: From Silents to Television. Scarecrow Press.

External links
 
 
 
 

1932 films
1932 romantic comedy films
American romantic comedy films
American black-and-white films
1930s English-language films
Remakes of American films
Films about actors
Films about filmmaking
Films about Hollywood, Los Angeles
Films based on American novels
American films based on plays
Films directed by William Beaudine
Films produced by B. P. Schulberg
Films scored by John Leipold
Paramount Pictures films
Sound film remakes of silent films
1930s American films